Zhuge Xu ( 255–260s) was a Chinese general and politician of the state of Cao Wei during the Three Kingdoms period of China.

Life
Zhuge Xu was from Yangdu County, Langya Commandery, which is in present-day Yinan County, Shandong. He was probably a distant relative of other famous Zhuges in the Three Kingdoms period, such as Zhuge Jin, Zhuge Liang and Zhuge Dan, since he shared the same ancestral home as them. He served in the state of Cao Wei in the Three Kingdoms period.

In 255, when the Wei generals Guanqiu Jian and Wen Qin started a rebellion in Shouchun (壽春; present-day Shou County, Anhui), Zhuge Xu was then serving as the Administrator of Taishan Commandery (泰山郡; around present-day Tai'an, Shandong). He led troops from Taishan Commandery to assist other Wei imperial forces led by the regent Sima Shi to suppress the rebellion.

Zhuge Xu was later promoted to the position of Inspector of Yong Province in an unknown year. In 263, he participated in the campaign against one of Wei's rival states, Shu. His mission was to lead 30,000 troops to block the Shu general Jiang Wei at a bridge in Yinping and stop him from reinforcing Yang'an Pass. When Jiang Wei heard about it, he pretended to launch an attack on Yong Province via Konghan Valley. Zhuge Xu fell for the ruse, thought that Jiang Wei wanted to attack his base, so he ordered his troops to retreat from Yinping by 30 li. Jiang Wei then seized the opportunity to cross the bridge at Yinping. When Zhuge Xu found out and tried to stop Jiang Wei, he was already one day behind time. Later, the Wei general Zhong Hui advanced south from Yang'an Pass and reached Baishui. At the time, another Wei general Deng Ai wanted to link up with Zhuge Xu and attack the enemy position at Jiangyou together, but Zhuge Xu refused and moved to Baishui to join Zhong Hui instead. At Baishui, Zhong Hui accused Zhuge Xu of cowardice, seized command of his troops and sent him as a prisoner back to Yong Province.

Zhuge Xu later served in the Jin dynasty (266–420), which replaced the Cao Wei state in February 266 after the regent Sima Yan usurped the throne from the last Wei emperor Cao Huan. He served as Minister of Ceremonies and Minister of the Guards under the Jin government.

See also
 Lists of people of the Three Kingdoms

References

Additional sources 
 Chen, Shou (3rd century). Records of the Three Kingdoms (Sanguozhi).
 Fang, Xuanling (ed.) (648). Book of Jin (Jin Shu).
 Pei, Songzhi (5th century). Annotations to Records of the Three Kingdoms (Sanguozhi zhu).
 Sima, Guang (1084). Zizhi Tongjian.

Year of birth unknown
Year of death unknown
Cao Wei generals
Cao Wei politicians
Jin dynasty (266–420) politicians
Political office-holders in Shandong
Political office-holders in Shaanxi